Vasiliy Lomachenko vs. Richard Commey, billed as Some Forces Can't Be Contained was a lightweight professional boxing match contested between former 3-division champion, Vasiliy Lomachenko, and former IBF lightweight champion, Richard Commey on December 11, 2021, at Madison Square Garden, in New York City, New York, U.S.

Background 
Both Lomachenko and Commey share a common loss with former unified lightweight champion, Teófimo López. Commey was knocked out by López in round two in their bout in 2019, losing the IBF lightweight title. Lomachenko lost his unified lightweight titles in an upset in 2020, losing by unanimous decision.

Lomachenko bounced back from his defeat to López, knocking out lightweight contender Masayoshi Nakatani in June 2021, and called López out for a rematch, claiming he "still wanted to become the undisputed champion" at lightweight.

Commey also bounced back from his defeat to López, knocking out Jackson Maríñez in round six in February 2021.

With both fighters looking for another shot at a world title, the pair agreed to face each other on December 11 in New York. The bout was aired live on ESPN in the US, and on Sky Sports in the UK and Ireland.

The fight 

Lomachenko won the bout by dominating a competent but unable-to-overcome Commey. Lomachenko was deemed winner by unanimous decision, all three fight judges giving him the contest by a considerable amount of points.

References  

Boxing matches at Madison Square Garden
2021 in boxing
2021 in sports in New York City
December 2021 sports events in the United States
2020s in Manhattan